An auxiliary ship is a naval ship designed to support combatant ships and other naval operations. Auxiliary ships are not primary combatant vessels, though they may have some limited combat capacity, usually for purposes of self-defense.

Auxiliary ships are extremely important for navies of all sizes because if they were not present the primary fleet vessels would be unsupported. Thus, virtually every navy maintains an extensive fleet of auxiliary ships. However, the composition and size of these auxiliary fleets vary depending on the nature of each navy and its primary mission. Smaller coastal navies tend to have smaller auxiliary vessels focusing primarily on littoral and training support roles. Larger blue-water navies tend to have larger auxiliary fleets comprising longer-range fleet support vessels designed to provide support far beyond territorial waters.

Roles

Replenishment

One of the most direct ways that auxiliary ships support the fleet is by providing underway replenishment (also known as "replenishment at sea") to major fleet units. This allow the fleet to remain in the same location, with the replenishment vessels bringing up fuel, ammunition, food, and supplies from shore to the fleet wherever it is operating. 

Oilers ("replenishment tanker") are vessels specifically designed to bring fuel oil to the fleet, while the earlier colliers supplied coal burning steamships. Specific role replenishment vessels include Combat stores ship, depot ship, general stores issue ship and ammunition ship. 

Tenders are specifically designed to support a type of smaller naval unit, like submarines, destroyer, and seaplanes, providing a mobile base of operations for these units: specifically destroyer tenders, submarine tenders, seaplane tenders, torpedo boat tenders.

Transport

Supporting front-line operating bases requires immense transportation capacity.  Transport ships are often converted merchant ships simply commissioned (APA, APD, APH, APV) into naval service. Tankers are transports specifically designed to ship fuel to forward locations. Transport ships are often employed not only carrying cargo for naval support but in support of all forces of a nation's military (AK, AKA, AKN, AKR, AKS). In particular, troopships and attack transports are used to carry a large number of soldiers to operational theatres. Some transport ships are highly specialized, like the ammunition ships employed by the US Navy. Large ocean tugs (AT, ATO, ATF, ATA, ATR) are used to tow large auxiliary ships, like barges, floating repair docks, and floating cranes in the open sea, also disabled ships.

Repair

Repairing ships at sea or in conflict areas is important as it allows these vessels to return to service more quickly, while also increasing the chance of survival for ships critically damaged in battle. Repair vessels (US Navy: AR, ARB, ARC, ARG, ARH, ARL, ARV) range from small equipment ships to Auxiliary repair docks, and larger Auxiliary floating drydock. Aircraft repair ships specialized in repair of naval aircraft.

Harbor

Harbor support is a critical support role, with various types of vessels including tugboats, barges, lighter barges, derrick-crane vessels, and others used to move ships and equipment around the port facilities, and depot ships and tends to service ships currently in the harbor. These vessels also help maintain the harbor by dredging channels, maintaining jetties and buoys, and even providing floating platforms for port defenses. 

In US Navy, tugboats are type YT, YTB, YTM, YTL or a Type V ship. and barges are classified as a Type B ship or YF, YFN, YFR, and YFRN.

Support
Radar picket to increase the radar detection range around a force. Communications Relay Ships (AGMR) are floating communications stations. Tracking ship or Range Instrumentation Ship (AGM) are equipped with antennas and electronics to support the launching and tracking of missiles and rockets. Command ship (AGF) are flagships of the commander of a fleet. Wind-class icebreaker (AGB WAGB) are support ships. Rescue and salvage ship and Submarine rescue ship (ASR) for surface support ship for ship and submarine rescue. Barracks ship or Auxiliary Personal Living, (APL) are vessels-barges for service men to live on.

Research
A wide variety of vessels are employed for research(AGTR) (AGM), Environmental Research Ships (AGER), Hydrofoil Research Ships (AGEH) and survey, primarily to provide a navy with a better understanding of its operating environment, or to assist in testing new technologies for employment in other vessels.

Hospital

Hospital ships are able to provide medical care in remote locations to personnel.

Unclassified auxiliary ship

The US Navy also used an unclassified miscellaneous auxiliary ship classification. The unclassified miscellaneous auxiliary ship classification is IX. An unclassified miscellaneous auxiliary ship can be a new ship without a classified role or a ship that does not fit into a standard category or a ship that had been removed from its classification.

See also
List of auxiliaries of the United States Navy
List of auxiliary ship classes in service
Service Squadron
US Naval Advance Bases

References

Notes

Bibliography

External links

 
Ship types